Ana Maria Giulietti Harley (born 1945) is a Brazilian biochemist, botanist, and educator known for researching Eriocaulaceae, as well as her work at the University of São Paulo, State University of Feira de Santana, and Vale Institute of Technology.  She has described over 70 species and gathered over 300 specimens. She was the 2013 recipient of the José Cuatrecasas Medal for Excellence in Tropical Botany.

Early life and education 
Born in Pesqueira, Brazil, Giulietti went on to receive her Bachelor's at Universidade Federal Rural de Pernambuco, Recife in 1967. She then studied for a Master's at the Universidade de São Paulo, which she received in 1970. She stayed at the university to undertake doctoral studies, where she investigated the genera Eriocaulon and Leiothrix. She received her PhD in 1978.

Awards 
In 2013 she was awarded the Jose Cuatrecasas Medal for Excellence in Tropical Botany.

References 

1945 births
Brazilian women scientists
21st-century Brazilian botanists
Living people
Academic staff of the University of São Paulo
20th-century Brazilian botanists